Werkraum is the creative music works of German musician Axel Frank.

Overview
Frank released material on CDRs and multiple compilations in the late 1990s and early 2000s until debuting with a full-length LP on Cold Spring Records in 2004. In 2005 the release Kristalle, Werkraum's second album followed. With Early love Music in 2008, Werkraum receive a more and more worldwide recognition.

Frank was a member of the band Sturmpercht, where he played under the pseudonym Hanns Aufschring, while his work for live sessions and for studio- and mastering engineering continued. New and more progressive works for Werkraum were announced for 2009 and 2010. He's still active under different monikers in the electronic music scene and works as producer.

References
Diesel, Andreas und Dr. Gerten, Dieter: Looking for Europe - Neofolk und Hintergründe., Zeltingen-Rachtig 2005,

Discography

Albums And EPs

Compilations (selection)

External links

Official
Official Werkraum Site

Interviews
September 2005 interview with Axel Frank by Malahki Thorn, (USA)
Interview in Folkworld Magazine from 2008 (UK)

Reviews
Review of Unsere Feuer Brennen! by Malahki Thorn/Heathen Harvest (USA)
Review of Kristalle by Tony Dickie/Compulsion (UK)
Review of "Early Love Music" by The Shadows Commence (Sweden)

German folk music groups
Neofolk music groups